Russell Phegan (born 15 February 1947) is an Australian former swimmer. He competed in two events at the 1964 Summer Olympics.

References

External links
 

1947 births
Living people
Australian male freestyle swimmers
Olympic swimmers of Australia
Swimmers at the 1964 Summer Olympics
Place of birth missing (living people)
People from Queensland
20th-century Australian people